Chambatan-e Sofla (also Romanized as Chambaţān-e Soflá; also known as Chambaţān-e Pā'īn) is a village in Cham Chamal Rural District, Bisotun District, Harsin County, Kermanshah Province, Iran. At the 2006 census, its population was 439, in 95 families.

References 

Populated places in Harsin County